Nasiba Tursunova is an Uzbekistani footballer who plays as a forward for Women's Championship club Bunyodkor. She has been a member of the Uzbekistan women's national team.

International career
Tursunova capped for Uzbekistan at senior level during the 2010 AFC Women's Asian Cup qualification.

See also
List of Uzbekistan women's international footballers

References 

Living people
Uzbekistani women's footballers
Uzbekistan women's international footballers
Women's association football forwards
Uzbekistani women's futsal players
Year of birth missing (living people)
21st-century Uzbekistani women